Philip Alexander Gibson (30 March 1887 – 4 October 1939) was an Australian rules footballer who played with Essendon in the Victorian Football League (VFL).

Death
He died in Camberwell, Victoria on 4 October 1939.

Notes

References 
 
 Maplestone, M., Flying Higher: History of the Essendon Football Club 1872–1996, Essendon Football Club, (Melbourne), 1996.

External links 

1887 births
1939 deaths
Australian rules footballers from Victoria (Australia)
Essendon Football Club players